= Kalamunda Community Radio =

Community radio station in Kalamunda, Western Australia

Coordinates: 31°57′27″S 116°02′01″E

Kalamunda Community Radio 88.9 FM is a not-for-profit community radio station based in Perth, Western Australia.

KCR 102.5FM includes jazz, blues, country/western, hip hop, classical, gospel, folk, techno, popular easy listening, indigenous, contemporary and classic rock broadcasting 24 hours a day, seven days a week.

== Programming ==
Notable programmes include Breakfast Variety (Sunrise) and Afternoon Drive (Traffic Jam).
